Vengal Chakkarai Chettiar (17 January 1880 – 14 June 1958) was an Indian Christian theologian, missionary, independence activist, politician and trade unionist. He was the former president of AITUC

Early life

Chakkarai was born to a Hindu Chettiar family. He was educated at the Scottish Mission School, Madras Christian College, graduating in 1901 after majoring in philosophy. He then studied at Madras Law College, and practiced for some time as a lawyer.

Career
In 1913, Chakkarai joined the Danish Mission Room as a Christian preacher and worked as a missionary for twenty years. During these years, he also became a disciple of Mahatma Gandhi and participated in the Indian independence movement. He served as mayor of Madras from 1941 to 1942. He was the president of  All India Trade Union Congress from 1954 to 1957.

Theology

Chakkarai tried to explain the Christian faith through the Hinduism point of view. This can be seen when he tried to find the meaning of cross for the followers of Christianity with how to get moksha.

Some of the Chakkarai's point of view about Christianity:
 Jesus is truly human (sat purusa).
 Holy Spirit is Christ himself who continues to exist and work until now.
 God can not be seen as the creator of sin.
 Humans themselves are responsible for the sins that they commit.
 Knowledge of God is not something that is intellectual  (jnana), but a personal experience of God (anubhava).
 Sin is seen as the handcuffs (pasa), which prevents the human soul (pasu) to reach  God.
 The essence of sin is the desire to find "the mystery of the forbidden".

References

 

1880 births
1958 deaths
Mayors of Chennai
Converts to Protestantism from Hinduism
Madras Christian College alumni
Indian Christian theologians
Indian independence activists from Tamil Nadu